Patricia Guasp Barrero (born 31 December 1977) is a Spanish politician, member of the Parliament of the Balearic Islands for Citizens, of which she also serves as Autonomic Coordinator of its regional branch.

Biography 
Born on 31 December 1977, in Palma, she graduated in Law from the Complutense University of Madrid and completed a master's degree in European Union law at the "Université libre de Bruxelles". She began working at the European Committee of the Regions in Brussels with paid internships. She has since worked as policy advisor for the European Parliament and for the government of Balearic Islands. She is currently on mandatory leave as a Senior Associate in the legal department of PwC.

She ran in the Cs list for the May 2019 Balearic regional election at the second place, being elected for the constituency of Mallorca. On 28 September 2020, she was appointed as leader of the regional branch of Citizens replacing Joan Mesquida. Ahead of the 6th Citizens' General Assembly, she announced a joint slate with Adrián Vázquez running for Secretary-General and herself for the position of Political Spokesperson. She received the support of the majority of members of the previous leadership, namely, Inés Arrimadas, Begoña Villacís and Carlos Carrizosa.

References 

1977 births
Complutense University of Madrid alumni
Citizens (Spanish political party) politicians
Living people
21st-century Spanish women politicians
People from Palma de Mallorca
Université libre de Bruxelles alumni
Members of the Parliament of the Balearic Islands
21st-century Spanish politicians